Tofu is a food prepared by coagulating soy milk and then pressing the resulting curds into solid white blocks of varying softness: silken, soft, firm, extra firm, or super firm. Tofu is also known as bean curd in English. Beyond these broad textural categories, there are many varieties of tofu. It has a subtle flavor, so it can be used in savory and sweet dishes. It is often seasoned or marinated to suit the dish and its flavors, and due to its spongy texture, it absorbs flavors well. It is a traditional component of East Asian and Southeast Asian cuisines, and has been consumed in China for over 2,000 years. In modern western cooking, it is most often treated as a meat substitute.

Nutritionally, tofu is low in calories, while containing a relatively large amount of protein. It is high in iron, and can have a high calcium or magnesium content depending on the coagulants (e.g. calcium chloride, calcium sulphate, magnesium sulphate) used in manufacturing.

Etymology 
The English word "tofu" comes from Japanese tōfu. The Japanese tofu, in turn, is a borrowing of Chinese  (Mandarin: dòufǔ; tou4-fu) 'bean curd, bean ferment'.

The earliest documentation of the word in English is towfu, in a 1770 letter from the English merchant James Flint to Benjamin Franklin. The term "bean curd(s)" for tofu has been used in the United States since at least 1840.

History 
Tofu making was first recorded during the Chinese Han dynasty about 2000 years ago. Chinese legend ascribes its invention to Prince Liu An (179122BC) of Anhui province. Tofu and its production technique were introduced to Japan during the Nara period (710794). Some scholars believe tofu arrived in Vietnam during the 10th and 11th centuries. It spread to other parts of Southeast Asia as well. This probably coincided with the spread of Buddhism as it is an important source of protein in the vegetarian diet of East Asian Buddhism. Li Shizhen, during the Ming Dynasty, described a method of making tofu in the Compendium of Materia Medica. Since then, tofu has become a staple in many countries, including Vietnam, Thailand, and Korea, with regional variations in production methods, texture, flavor, and usage.

Theories of origin 
The most commonly held of the three theories of tofu's origin maintains that tofu was discovered by Lord Liu An, a Han Dynasty prince. While plausible, the paucity of reliable sources for this period makes this difficult to conclusively determine. In Chinese history, important inventions were frequently attributed to important leaders and figures of the time. In 1960, a stone mural unearthed from an Eastern Han dynasty tomb provided support for the theory of the Han origin of tofu; however some scholars maintain that tofu during the Han dynasty was rudimentary and lacked the firmness and taste for it to be considered as tofu.

Another theory suggests that the production method for tofu was discovered accidentally when a slurry of boiled, ground soybeans was mixed with impure sea salt. Such sea salt would probably have contained calcium and magnesium salts, allowing the soy mixture to curdle and produce a tofu-like gel.

The last group of theories maintains that the ancient Chinese learned the method for curdling soy milk by emulating the milk curdling techniques of the Mongolians or East Indians. Despite their advanced culture, no technology or knowledge of culturing and processing milk products existed within ancient Chinese society. The primary evidence for this theory is the etymological similarity between the Chinese term rǔfǔ, which literally means "milk curdled", used during Sui Dynasty (AD 581–618), for dishes with a consistency like yogurt or soft cheese), later influenced by Mongolian milk products and methods of production, and the term dòufu ("beans curdled" ) or tofu. Although intriguing and possible, there is no evidence to substantiate this theory beyond academic speculation.

East Asia

China

A form of tofu may have been discovered during the Han dynasty (202AD 220), but it did not become a popular food in China until the Song dynasty (960–1279).

In China, tofu is traditionally used as a food offering when visiting the graves of deceased relatives. It is claimed that the spirits (or ghosts) have long lost their chins and jaws so that only tofu is soft enough for them to eat. Before refrigeration was available in China, tofu was often only sold during winter since tofu did not spoil as easily in cold weather. During the warmer months, tofu, once made, spoiled if stored for more than a day.

Japan

Tofu was introduced to Japan during the Nara period (late 8th century) by Zen Buddhist monks, who initially called it . A firm variation of tofu was introduced in Tosa Province, today's Kochi Prefecture, by a Korean doctor and prisoner of war following the Japanese invasions of Korea (1592–1598). Much of tofu's early use in East Asia was as a vegetarian substitute for meat and fish by Buddhist monks, especially those following Zen Buddhism.

The earliest Japanese document concerning tofu refers to the dish being served as an offering at the Kasuga Shrine in Nara in 1183. The book Tofu Hyakuchin, published in 1782 of the Edo period, lists 100 recipes for cooking tofu.

Southeast Asia
In Southeast Asia, tofu was introduced to the region by Chinese immigrants from Fujian province, as evidenced by many countries in Southeast Asia referring to tofu using the Min Nan Chinese word for either soft or firm tofu, or "tāu-hū" or "tāu-goan" respectively. In Indonesia, Malaysia, Singapore, Thailand, Cambodia, Myanmar, the Philippines and Vietnam, tofu is widely available and used in many local dishes. 

Tofu is called tahu in Indonesia, and Indonesian dishes such as tahu sumbat, taugeh tahu, asinan, siomay and some curries, often add slices of tofu. Tahu goreng, tahu isi and tahu sumedang are popular fried tofu snacks. 

Tofu is called tauhu in Malaysia and Singapore. Malaysian and Singaporean Indians use tofu in their cuisine, such as in Indian mee goreng, and rojak pasembor. Peranakan cuisine often uses tofu, as in Penang curry noodles and laksa. Indonesia, Thailand, Malaysia, and the Philippines are major producers of tofu and have plants in many municipalities.

Tofu in the Philippines is widely eaten as the breakfast snack tahô (soft tofu, from Philippine Hokkien 豆腐 "tāu-hū"), or as tokwa (dry, firm tofu that is usually fried, from Philippine Hokkien 豆干 "tāu-goan"), which is a staple alternative to meat in main meals and in numerous regional dishes. Tofu was introduced to the archipelago in the 10th to 13th centuries by Song dynasty Chinese mariners and merchants, along with many other foods that became staples of the Philippine diet. The use and production of tofu were first limited to urban centers with influential Chinese minorities, such as Cebu or Tondo, but quickly spread to even remote native villages and islands.

Elsewhere 
Benjamin Franklin was the first American to mention tofu, in a 1770 letter to John Bartram. Franklin, who encountered it during a trip to London, included a few soybeans and referred to it as "cheese" from China. In 1770, Franklin also corresponded with James Flint on the subject of how the Chinese converted callivances (soybeans) into tofu. Flint's writing "Towfu" in his letter is the earliest documented use of "tofu" in the English language. The first tofu company in the United States was established in 1878. In 1908, Li Yuying, a Chinese anarchist and a vegetarian with a French degree in agriculture and biology, opened a soy factory, the Usine de la Caséo-Sojaïne. This was the world's first soy dairy and the first factory in France to manufacture and sell beancurd. However, tofu was not well known to most Westerners before the middle of the 20th century. With increased cultural contact between the West and East Asia and growing interest in vegetarianism, knowledge of tofu has become widespread. Numerous types of pre-flavored tofu can be found in supermarket chains throughout the West. It is also used by many vegans and vegetarians as a source of protein.

Production 

Regardless of the product or scale of the production, the production of tofu essentially consists of:
 The preparation of soy milk
 The coagulation of the soy milk to form curds (douhua)
 The pressing of the soybean curds to form tofu cakes

It is similar to the production of dairy cheese by coagulating the milk of dairy animals to form curds and pressing and aging the curds to form cheese. Typical tofu-making procedures are cleaning, soaking, grinding beans in water, filtering, boiling, coagulation, and pressing.

Coagulation of the protein and oil (emulsion) suspended in boiled soy milk is the most important step in the production of tofu. This process is accomplished with the aid of coagulants. Coagulation depends on complex interactions. There are many variables including the variety and percentage of protein in the soybeans used, slurry cooking temperature, coagulation temperature, and other factors.

Soybean proteins are mainly composed of 7S and 11S proteins. The negative surface charges on these globulins usually cause them to repel each other. Heating soy milk denatures the proteins and exposes hydrophobic groups normally oriented toward the inside of the globulin structure. Cations from coagulants bind the negatively charged groups. As the net charges of the protein molecules are neutralized, attractive hydrophobic interactions dominate over repulsive electrostatic charges, and protein aggregates are formed.

Two types of coagulants (salts and acids) are used commercially.

Salt coagulants 

 Calcium sulfate (gypsum) – a traditional and most widely used coagulant to produce Chinese-style tofu, it produces a tofu that is tender but slightly brittle in texture. The coagulant itself is tasteless. Also known as gypsum, calcium sulfate is quarried from geological deposits, and no chemical processing or refining is needed, making it the cheapest coagulant used in tofu production. When used in production, the coagulation reaction is slower due to its low solubility, forming a smooth, more gelatinous tofu with relatively high water content and soft texture. Use of this coagulant also makes tofu that is rich in calcium. As such, many tofu manufacturers choose to use this coagulant to be able to market their tofu as a good source of dietary calcium. 
 Chloride-type nigari salts or lushui (Traditional: 鹵水, 滷水; Simplified: 卤水; Pinyin: lǔshuǐ) – Magnesium chloride and calcium chloride: Both of these salts are highly soluble in water and affect soy protein in the same way, whereas gypsum is only very slightly soluble in water and acts differently in soy protein precipitation, the basis of tofu formation. These are the coagulants used to make tofu with a smooth and tender texture. In Japan, a white powder called nigari, which consists primarily of magnesium chloride, is produced from seawater after the sodium chloride is removed and the water evaporated. Depending on its production method, nigari/Lushui may also contain small quantities of magnesium sulfate (Epsom salt), potassium chloride, calcium chloride, and trace amounts of other naturally occurring salts. Although the term nigari is derived from nigai, the Japanese word for "bitter", neither nigari nor pure magnesium chloride imparts a perceivable taste to the finished tofu. Calcium chloride is not found in seawater in significant quantities and therefore is not regarded as nigari. It is used extensively in the United States due to its flavor and low cost. Fresh clean seawater itself can also be used as a coagulant.

Acid coagulants 
 Glucono delta-lactone (GDL): A naturally occurring organic acid also used in cheesemaking, this coagulant produces a very fine textured tofu that is almost jelly-like. It is used especially for "silken" and softer tofus and confers a faint sour taste to the finished product. GDL is derived from glucose and takes the form of a white powder at room temperature. Its molecular structure contains a six-membered heterocyclic ring that is hydrolyzed upon contact with water, slowly converting GDL to gluconic acid. When added to soy milk, it gradually lowers the pH and causes proteins to coagulate evenly throughout the mixture, forming a single, smooth gel free of air gaps that resist breaking during transportation. Using GDL as a coagulant, silken tofu can be formed directly in its container, as it does not require pressing. This acid coagulant is also commonly used together with calcium sulfate to give soft tofu a smooth, tender texture.
 Other edible acids: Though they can affect the taste of the tofu more, and vary in density and texture, acids such as acetic acid (vinegar) and citric acid (such as lemon juice), can also be used to coagulate soy milk and produce tofu.

Enzyme coagulants 
 Among enzymes that have been shown to produce tofu are papain, and alkaline and neutral proteases from microorganisms. Papain, moreover, has been studied as a gelling agent to produce "instant tofu" from soy protein isolate and soy glycinin (11S) protein.

Contemporary tofu manufacturers may choose to use one or more of these coagulants since each plays a role in producing the desired texture in the finished tofu. Different textures result from different pore sizes and other microscopic features in the tofu produced using each coagulant. The coagulant mixture is dissolved in water, and the solution is then stirred into boiled soy milk until the mixture curdles into a soft gel.

Coagulants are typically added at concentrations between 1.5 and 5.0 g/kg. In all coagulants consisting of calcium or magnesium salts, the positive double-bonded ions of the calcium or magnesium are responsible for the coagulation of the soy proteins which become part of the tofu, thereby enhancing its nutritional value. Only 1 part per 1000 of the tofu eaten is coagulant; most of the coagulant reacts with soy protein and is broken down into ions. The non-reactive portion dissolves in the whey and is discarded.

The curds are processed differently depending on the form of tofu that is being manufactured. For soft silken tofu (nèndòufu in Chinese or  kinugoshi-dōfu in Japanese) or tofu pudding (dòuhuā OR 豆腐花, dòufuhuā in Chinese or  Oboro-dōfu in Japanese) the soy milk is curdled directly in the tofu's final packaging. For standard firm East Asian tofu, the soy curd is cut and strained of excess liquid using cheesecloth or muslin and then lightly pressed to produce a soft cake. Firmer tofus, such as East Asian dry tofu (' in Chinese or  Shimi-dōfu in Japanese) or Western types of tofu, are further pressed to remove even more liquid. In Vietnam, the curd is strained and molded in a square mold, and the end product is called đậu khuôn (molded bean) or đậu phụ (one of the Vietnamese ways to pronounce the Chinese dòufu). The tofu curds are allowed to cool and become firm. The finished tofu can then be cut into pieces, flavored or further processed.

Although tartness is sometimes desired in dessert tofu, the acid used in flavoring is usually not the primary coagulant, since concentrations sufficiently high to induce coagulation negatively affect the flavor or texture of the resulting tofu. A sour taste in tofu and a slight cloudiness in its storing liquid is also usually an indication of bacterial growth and, hence, spoilage.

Color 
The whiteness of tofu is ultimately determined by the soybean variety, soybean protein composition, and degree of aggregation of the tofu gel network. The yellowish-beige color of soybeans is due to the color compounds including anthocyanin, isoflavones, and polyphenol compounds; therefore the soybean variety used will predicate the color of the final tofu product. Ways to reduce the yellow color include reducing isoflavone content by changing the pH of the soy milk solution used in the production of the tofu so that the relevant compounds precipitate out and are removed during the extraction of okara. The opacity of tofu gel and the off-white color typical of standard uncooked firm tofu is due to the scattering of light by the colloidal particles of the tofu. The addition of higher levels of calcium salts or a high protein content will contribute to forming a denser and more aggregated gel network which disperses more light, resulting in tofu with a whiter appearance.

Flavor 

Tofu flavor is generally described as bland, which is the taste desired by customers in North America. A more beany flavor is preferred in East Asia. The beany or bland taste is generated during the grinding and cooking process, and either a "hot grind" or a "cold grind" can be used to influence the taste. The hot grind method reduces the beany flavor by inactivating the lipoxygenase enzyme in the soy protein that is known to generate off flavors. Eliminating these flavors makes tofu that is "bland".  If a cold grind is used lipoxygenase remains and produces the aldehyde, alcohol, and ester volatile compounds that create beany notes.

Varieties 
A wide variety of types and flavors of tofu is available in both Western and Eastern markets. Despite the range of options, tofu products can be split into two main categories: 'fresh tofu', which is produced directly from soy milk, and 'processed tofu', which is produced from fresh tofu. Tofu production also creates important by-products that are used in various cuisines.

Unpressed fresh
Unpressed fresh tofu is gelled soy milk with curd that has not been cut and pressed of its liquid. Depending on whether the soy milk is gelled with bittern (magnesium chloride) solution or a suspension of gypsum (calcium sulphate), different types of unpressed tofu is produced. Gypsum-gelled soft tofu has a smooth and gel-like texture and is commonly known as soft tofu, silken-tofu, or douhua. The bittern-gelled variety has a very soft spongy curdled texture and is known as extra-soft or sun-dubu.

Unpressed tofu is so soft that it is directly ladled out for serving or sold with its gelling container.

Extra soft 

Unpressed bittern-gelled soft tofu is called sun-dubu ("mild tofu") in Korean. Soy milk is mixed with seawater, or saline water made with sea salt, so that it curdles. The curds remain loose and soft. Freshly made sun-dubu is eaten boiled with little or no seasoning. Manufactured sundubu is usually sold in tubes. It is also the main ingredient in sundubu-jjigae ("soft tofu stew").

Although the word sun in sun-dubu does not have a Sino-Korean origin, sun-dubu is often translated into Chinese and Japanese using the Chinese character , whose Korean pronunciation is sun and the meaning is "pure". Thus in China, sun-dubu is called chún dòufu ("pure tofu"), and in Japan, it is called jun-tōfu or sundubu.

Soft 

Soft tofu, also known as "silken tofu", is called nèndòufu ("soft tofu") or huádòufu ("smooth tofu") in Chinese; kinugoshi-dōfu ("silk-filtered tofu") in Japanese; and yeon-dubu ("soft tofu") in Korean. Gelled with gypsum, this tofu is undrained, and unpressed, and contains a high moisture content. Silken tofu is produced by coagulating soy milk without cutting the curd. Silken tofu is available in several consistencies, including soft and firm, but all silken tofu is more delicate than regular firm tofu (pressed tofu) and it has different culinary uses. Silken tofu can be used as a substitute for dairy products and eggs, especially for smoothies and baked desserts.

It is most often eaten as a hot dessert, but sometimes salty pickles or hot sauce are added. This is a type of soft tofu with very high moisture content. Because using chopsticks make douhua difficult to pick up, it is generally eaten with a spoon. With the addition of flavorings such as finely chopped spring onions, dried shrimp, soy sauce, or chilli sauce, douhua is a popular breakfast dish across China. In Malaysia, douhua is usually served warm with white or dark palm sugar syrup, or served cold with longans. It is frequently served at breakfast or for dessert. It is usually served either with a sweet ginger syrup, or a mushroom gravy called da lu. It's normally coagulated at the restaurant into a serving container. Douhua is not always considered a type of tofu, but rather a type of food in its own right.

Some variation exists among soft tofus. Black douhua (hēidòuhuā) is a type of silken tofu made from black soybeans, which is usually made into dòuhuā rather than firm or dry tofu. The texture of black bean tofu is slightly more gelatinous than regular douhua and the color is greyish in tone. This type of tofu is eaten for its earthy "black bean taste". Edamame tofu is a Japanese variety of kinugoshi tōfu made from edamame (fresh green soybeans); it is pale green in color and often studded with whole edamame.

Pressed fresh 
Depending on the amount of water that is extracted from the cut and pressed curds two types of tofu are produced: firm, and extra firm. Fresh tofu is usually sold completely immersed in water to maintain its moisture content and freshness, and to suppress bacterial growth.

Firm 

It has the firmness of raw meat and bounces back readily when pressed. The texture of the inside of the tofu is similar to that of a firm custard. The skin of this form of tofu retains the pattern of the muslin used to drain it, and the outside is slightly more resistant to damage than the inside. It can be picked up easily with chopsticks.

A very firm type of momen-dōfu is eaten in parts of Japan, called ishi-dōfu (石豆腐, "stone tofu") in parts of Ishikawa, or iwa-dōfu (岩豆腐, "rock tofu") in Gokayama in the Toyama Prefecture and in Iya in the prefecture of Tokushima. These types of firm tofu are produced with seawater instead of nigari (magnesium chloride), or using concentrated soy milk. Some of them are squeezed using heavy weights to eliminate excess moisture. These products are produced in areas where traveling is inconvenient, such as remote islands, mountain villages, and heavy snowfall areas.

Extra-firm 

Dòugān (literally "dry tofu" in Chinese) or su ji (vegetarian chicken) is an extra firm variety of tofu where a large proportion of the liquid has been pressed out. Dòugān contains the least moisture of all fresh tofu, the firmness of fully cooked meat, and a somewhat rubbery feel similar to that of paneer. When sliced thinly this tofu can be crumbled easily. The skin of this form of tofu has the pattern of the muslin used to drain and press it. Western firm tofu is milled and reformed after pressing.

Su ji is a more common type of unflavored, extra-firm tofu. It cannot be crumbled and has a more rubbery texture. One variety of dried tofu is pressed especially flat and sliced into long strings with a cross-section smaller than 2 mm × 2 mm. Shredded dried tofu (dòugānsī in Chinese, or simply , gānsī), which looks like loose cooked noodles, can be served cold, stir-fried, or added to soup, as with Japanese aburaage.

Processed tofu 
Many forms of processed tofu exist. Some processing techniques probably  originate before the days of refrigeration from the need to preserve tofu or to increase its shelf life. Other production techniques are employed to create tofus with different textures and flavors.

Fermented 

 Pickled tofu ( in Chinese, pinyin: dòufurǔ, or  fŭrŭ; chao in Vietnamese), also called "preserved tofu" or "fermented tofu", consists of cubes of dried tofu that have been allowed to fully air-dry under hay and slowly ferment with the help of aerial bacteria. The dry fermented tofu is then soaked in salt water, Chinese rice wine, vinegar or minced chiles, or in a mixture of whole rice, bean paste, and soybeans. In the case of red pickled tofu ( in Chinese, Pinyin: hóng dòufurǔ), red yeast rice (cultivated with Monascus purpureus) is added for color. In Japan, pickled tofu with miso paste is called tofu no misodzuke, and is a traditional preserved food in Kumamoto. In Okinawa, pickled and fermented tofu is called tofuyo (豆腐餻). It is made from Shima-doufu (an Okinawan variety of large and firm tofu). It is fermented and matured with koji mold, red koji mold, and awamori.
 Stinky tofu ( in Chinese, Pinyin: chòudòufu) is soft tofu that has been fermented in a vegetable and fish brine. The blocks of tofu have a pungent cheese smell, sometimes resembling rotting food. Despite its strong odor, the flavor and texture of stinky tofu is appreciated by aficionados, who describe it as delightful. The texture of this tofu is similar to the soft East Asian tofu from which it is made. The rind that stinky tofu develops when fried is said to be best when especially crisp, and fried stinky tofu is usually served with soy sauce, sweet sauce, or hot sauce.

Frozen 

 Thousand-layer tofu (千葉豆腐, qiānyè dòufu, literally "thousand-layer tofu", or 凍豆腐 dòngdòufu, 冰豆腐 bīngdòufu in Chinese, both meaning "frozen tofu") is a frozen tofu. The ice crystals that develop within it result in the formation of large cavities that appear to be layered. Frozen tofu takes on a yellowish hue in the freezing process. Thousand-layer tofu originates from the Jiangnan region of China and is commonly made at home from soft tofu. It is also commercially sold as a specialty in Hong Kong, Taiwan, and other areas with Jiangnan emigrants. It is regularly paired with tatsoi as a winter dish. Frozen tofu is defrosted before serving and sometimes pressed to remove moisture prior to use.

During freezing, the ice crystals puncture cell walls and facilitate the release of free and bound water and cause a decrease in total water content in tofu after freezing then thawing. The initial protein-water bonds are irreversibly replaced by protein-protein bonds, which are more elastic and cause a structural change to the gel network and lead to an increase in textural properties such as hardness, springiness, cohesiveness, and gumminess.

In Japan, two kinds of freeze-dried tofu are produced. Those are usually rehydrated by being soaked in water prior to consumption. In their dehydrated state, they do not require refrigeration.
 Kori tofu (凍り豆腐, literally "frozen tofu") is freeze-dried. Koya-dofu (kōya-dōfu, 高野豆腐 in Japanese) is a freeze-dried tofu from Mount Kōya, a center of Japanese Buddhism famed for its shōjin ryōri, or traditional Buddhist vegetarian cuisine. It is said that the method of Koya-dofu was discovered by accident by leaving tofu outdoors in the winter season. It is sold in freeze-dried blocks or cubes in Japanese markets. It is typically simmered in dashi, sake or mirin and soy sauce. In shōjin ryōri, vegetarian kombu dashi, made from seaweed, is used. When prepared in the usual manner, it has a spongy texture and a mildly sweet or savory flavor. The taste and flavor depend on what soup or cooking stock it was simmered in. A similar form of freeze-dried tofu, in smaller pieces, is found in instant soups (such as miso soup), in which the toppings are freeze-dried and stored in sealed pouches.
 Shimidofu (凍み豆腐) is mainly consumed in the Tohoku region. While Koya-dofu is made by shade-drying, shimidofu is made by sun-drying.

By-products

Tofu skin 

Tofu skin is produced when soy milk is boiled in an open, shallow pan, thus producing a film or skin composed primarily of a soy protein-lipid complex on the liquid surface. Its approximate composition is 50–55% protein, 24–26% lipids (fat), 12% carbohydrate, 3% ash, and 9% moisture.

The skin can also be dried into a product known as "tofu bamboo" (fǔzhú in Chinese; phù trúc in Vietnamese; kusatake, Japanese), or into many other shapes. Since tofu skin has a soft yet rubbery texture, it can be folded or shaped into different forms and cooked further to imitate meat in vegan cuisine. Some factories dedicate their production to tofu skin and other soy membrane products. Tofu skin is commonly sold in the form of dried leaves or sheets. Other people would put the "tofu bamboo" into congee (a watery rice mixture that is eaten for breakfast) so that the congee becomes more silky and smooth, and gives a whole new texture. Also, soft, fragile skin would be on the congee once it cools down.Tofu skin is cooked with noodles.

Soy pulp 

Okara, from the Japanese  is known as  xuěhuācài, in Chinese, lit.

Sometimes known in the west as "soy pulp" or "tofu lees", okara is a tofu by-product consisting of the fiber, protein, and starch left over when soy milk has been extracted from ground soaked soybeans. It is often used as animal feed in most tofu-producing cultures, but also has other uses in Japanese and Korean cuisines, such as in the Korean stew kongbiji jjigae. It is also an ingredient for vegetarian burgers in many Western nations. In Japan, it is used to make ice cream.

Tofu-like foods 
The term tofu is used by extension for similarly textured curdled dishes that do not use soy products, such as "almond tofu" (almond jelly),  (egg),  (sesame), or peanut tofu (Chinese  luòhuāshēng dòufu and Okinawan ).

Due to their East Asian origins and their textures, many food items are called "tofu", even though their production processes are not technically similar. For instance, many sweet almond tofus are actually gelatinous desserts hardened using agar or gelatin. Some foods, such as Burmese tofu, are not coagulated from the "milk" of the legume but rather set in a manner similar to soft polenta, Korean muk, or the jidou liangfen of Yunnan province of southwest China.

Almond tofu 
"Almond tofu" ( xìngrén dòufu; Japanese: annindōfu) is a milky white and gelatinous substance resembling tofu, but it does not use soy products or soy milk and is hardened with agar. A similar dessert made with coconut milk or mango juices may occasionally be referred to as "coconut tofu" or "mango tofu", although such names are also given to hot dishes that use soy tofu and coconut or mango in the recipe.

Chickpea tofu 

Burmese tofu (to hpu in Burmese) is a legume product made from besan (chana dal) flour; the Shan variety uses yellow split pea flour instead. Both types are yellow in color and generally found only in Myanmar, though the Burman variety is also available in some overseas restaurants serving Burmese cuisine. Burmese tofu may be fried as fritters cut into rectangular or triangular shapes.

A variety called hsan to hpu (or hsan ta hpo in Shan regions) is made from rice flour (called hsan hmont or mont hmont) and is white in color with the same consistency as yellow Burmese tofu when set. It is eaten as a salad in the same manner as yellow tofu.

Egg tofu 
"Japan bean curd") is the main type of savory flavored tofu. Whole beaten eggs are combined with dashi, poured into molds, and cooked in a steamer (cf. chawanmushi). This tofu has a pale golden color that can be attributed to the addition of eggs and, occasionally, food coloring. This tofu has a fuller texture and flavor than silken tofu, due to the presence of egg fat and proteins. Plain "dried tofu" can be flavored by stewing in soy sauce to make soy-sauce tofu. It is common to see tofu sold from hot food stalls in this soy-sauce stewed form. Today Egg "Japanese" tofu is made of eggs, water, vegetable protein, and seasoning.

Egg tofu was invented in Japan during the Edo period. The book《万宝料理秘密箱》written in 1785 recorded how to make Japanese tofu. Later the Japanese form of tofu entered Southeast Asia, being introduced to China in 1995 from Malaysia.

100 grams of Egg tofu has 17 mg calcium, 24 mg magnesium, and 5 grams protein while 100 grams tofu has 138 mg calcium, 63 mg magnesium and 12.2 grams protein. Compared with tofu, Japanese tofu's nutritional value is lower. 

Tofu dishes common in Japan include three delicacies Japanese tofu; shrimp Japanese tofu; Japanese tofu in ketchup; teppanyaki Japanese tofu; and Japanese fish-flavored tofu.

Peanut tofu 
In Okinawa, Japan,  a peanut milk, made by crushing raw peanuts, adding water and straining, is combined with starch (usually sweet potato, known locally as umukuji or ) and heated until curdling occurs.

The Chinese equivalent is  luòhuāshēng dòufu.

Sesame tofu 
It is often served chilled as hiyayakko.

Preparation 
Tofu has very little flavor or smell of its own. Consequently, tofu can be used in both savory and sweet dishes, acting as a bland background for presenting the flavors of the other ingredients used. In order to flavor the tofu it is often marinated in soy sauce, chillis, sesame oil, etc.

In East Asian cooking, tofu is prepared in many ways, including raw, stewed, stir-fried, in soup, cooked in sauce, or stuffed with fillings. The idea of using tofu as a meat substitute is not common in East Asia.

East Asia

China 
Many Chinese tofu dishes such as jiācháng dòufu (家常豆腐) and mápó dòufu (麻婆豆腐) may include meat.

In Chinese cuisine, Dòuhuā is served with toppings such as boiled peanuts, azuki beans, cooked oatmeal, tapioca, mung beans, or a syrup flavored with ginger or almond. During the summer, "dòuhuā" is served with crushed ice; in the winter, it is served warm.
In many parts of China, fresh tofu is eaten with soy sauce or further flavored with katsuobushi shavings, century eggs ( pídàn), and sesame seed oil.

With the exception of the softest tofus, all forms of tofu can be fried. Thin and soft varieties of tofu are deep fried in oil until they are light and airy in their core 豆泡 dòupào, 豆腐泡 dòufupào, 油豆腐 yóudòufu, or 豆卜 dòubǔ in Chinese, literally "bean bubble", describing the shape of the fried tofu as a bubble.

Depending on the type of tofu used, the texture of deep-fried tofu may range from crispy on the outside and custardy on the inside, to puff up like a plain doughnut. The former is usually eaten plain in Chinese cuisine with garlic soy sauce, while the latter is either stuffed with fish paste to make Yong Tau Foo or cooked in soups. In Taiwan, fried tofu is made into a dish called "A-gei", which consists of a fried aburage tofu package stuffed with noodles and capped with surimi.

Tofus such as firm East Asian and dòugān (Chinese dry tofu), with their lower moisture content, are cut into bite-sized cubes or triangles and deep fried until they develop a golden-brown, crispy surface (炸豆腐 in Chinese, zhádòufu, lit. "fried tofu"). These may be eaten on their own or with a light sauce, or further cooked in liquids; they are also added to hot pot dishes or included as part of the vegetarian dish called luohan zhai.

A spicy Sichuan preparation using firm East Asian tofu is mápó dòufu. It involves braised tofu in a beef, chili, and fermented bean paste sauce. A vegetarian version is known as málà dòufu.

Dried tofu is usually not eaten raw but first stewed in a mixture of soy sauce and spices. Some types of dried tofu are pre-seasoned with special blends of spices, so that the tofu may either be called "five-spice tofu" ( wǔxiāng dòufu) or "soy sauce stewed tofu" ( lǔshuǐ dòufu). Dried tofu is typically served thinly sliced with chopped green onions or with slices of meat for added flavor.

Tofu bamboos are often used in lamb stew or in a dessert soup. Tofu skins are often used as wrappers in dim sum.  Freeze-dried tofu and frozen tofu are rehydrated and enjoyed in savory soups. These products are often taken along on camping trips since a small bag of them can provide protein for many days.

Pickled tofu is commonly used in small amounts together with its soaking liquid to flavor stir-fried or braised vegetable dishes (particularly leafy green vegetables such as water spinach). It is often eaten directly as a condiment with rice or congee.

Japan 

In Japan, a common lunch in the summer months is hiyayakko, silken or firm East Asian tofu served with freshly grated ginger, green onions, or katsuobushi shavings with soy sauce. In the winter, tofu is frequently eaten as yudofu, which is simmered in a clay pot in kombu dashi, with vegetables such as Chinese cabbage or green onion.

Deep fried tofu is called atsuage (厚揚げ) or namaage (生揚げ) in Japan. The thinner variety called aburaage (油揚げ), develops a tofu pouch often used for inarizushi.

In Japan, cubes of lightly coated and fried tofu topped with a kombu dashi-based sauce are called agedashi dōfu. Soft tofu that has been thinly sliced and deep fried, known as aburage in Japan, is commonly blanched, seasoned with soy sauce and mirin and served in dishes such as kitsune udon.

In Gifu Prefecture, there is a local specialty called komo-dofu, which consists of tofu that has been wrapped in a komo, or mat of woven straw, which leaves its imprint on the exterior. The wrapped tofu is then boiled in soup stock. Voids within the tofu develop during the boiling process, allowing the soup stock flavor to penetrate and giving it a distinctive porous appearance.

Soft tofu can also be broken up or mashed and mixed with raw ingredients prior to being cooked. For example, Japanese ganmodoki is a mixture of chopped vegetables and mashed tofu. The mixture is bound together with starch and deep-fried. Chinese families sometimes make a steamed meatloaf or meatball dish from equal parts of coarsely mashed tofu and ground pork.

Japanese miso soup is frequently made with tofu.

Korea 
Dubu plays an important part in Korean cuisine. Tofu is often pan-fried and served as banchan with a dipping sauce. It is also used in many soups. Cubes of firm tofu can be seasoned with soy sauce, garlic, and other ingredients before pan-frying. A dish of tofu cubes simmered with similar spicy seasoning is called dubu-jorim. Dubu-kimchi features blanched tofu served in rectangular slices around the edges of a plate with pan-fried kimchi. This is a popular food to accompany alcoholic drinks (anju). Soft, unpressed sun-dubu is used as the main ingredient of sundubu-jjigae (soft tofu stew), while other soups and stews such as doenjang-guk (soybean paste soup), doenjang-jjigae (soybean paste stew), and kimchi-jjigae (kimchi stew) tend to have diced firm tofu in them. As in many other East Asian countries, tofu is also enjoyed in a hot pot dish called dubu-jeongol (tofu hot pot).

Southeast Asia

Indonesia
In Indonesia, tofu is called tahu, a loanword from the Hokkien Chinese pronunciation of tofu (tāu-hū, 豆腐). In Indonesian markets, tofu is usually available in two forms: tahu putih or common white firm tofu; and tahu goreng or fried tofu that has developed a brown skin. Tahu yun yi or tahu Bandung is yellow tofu colored with turmeric.

A common cooking technique in many parts of East and Southeast Asia involves deep frying tofu in vegetable oil, sunflower oil, or canola oil. In Indonesia, it is usually fried in palm oil. Although pre-fried tofu is often sold cold, it is seldom eaten directly and requires additional cooking.

Popular Indonesian tofu dishes includes tahu gejrot and kupat tahu. Tahu gejrot is tahu pong type of hollow fried tofu cut into small pieces, served with a thin, watery dressing made by blending palm sugar, vinegar, and sweet soy sauce, garnished with chili pepper, garlic, and shallot.  Kupat tahu is slices of tofu served with ketupat rice cake, usually in peanut sauce dressing. Slices of tofu usually mixed in gado-gado, ketoprak and siomay.

Bacem is a method of cooking tofu originating in Central Java. The tofu is boiled in coconut water, mixed with lengkuas (galangal), Indonesian bay leaves, coriander, shallot, garlic, tamarind and palm sugar. After the spicy coconut water has completely evaporated, the tofu is fried until it is golden brown. The result is moist but rather firm, sweet, and spicy tofu. This cooked tofu variant is commonly known as tahu bacem in Indonesian. Tahu bacem is commonly prepared along with tempeh and chicken.

Philippines 
In the Philippines, the sweet delicacy taho is made of fresh tofu with brown sugar syrup and sago. The Malaysian and Singaporean version of taho or douhua is called tofufa or taufufa. Warm soft tofu is served in slices (created by scooping it from a wooden bucket with a flat spoon) in a bowl with either pandan-flavored sugar syrup or palm sugar syrup.

Vietnam 
In Vietnam, dòuhuā, pronounced tào phớ, phớ, tào phở, óc đậu, tàu hủ/đậu hũ nước đường, đậu hoa, and đậu pha is a variety of soft tofu made and carried around in an earthenware jar. It is served by being scooped into a bowl with a very shallow and flat spoon, and it is eaten hot together with either powdered sugar and lime juice or ginger-flavored syrup.

Another popular dish with tofu would be bún đậu mắm tôm which is a dish with rice noodles served with tofu and shrimp paste.

Myanmar

Elsewhere 
Generally, the firmer styles of tofu are used for kebabs, mock meats, and dishes requiring a consistency that holds together, while the softer styles can be used for desserts, soups, shakes, and sauces.

Some people enjoy tofu made and prepared with chocolate and making it into pies and mousse along with other tofu desserts.

This came about due to vegans and vegetarians avoiding the usage of items such as milk and eggs.

Firm Western tofu types can be barbecued since they hold together on a barbecue grill. These types are usually marinated overnight as the marinade does not easily penetrate the entire block of tofu. (Techniques to increase the penetration of marinades include stabbing repeatedly with a fork or freezing and thawing prior to marinating.) Grated firm Western tofu is sometimes used in conjunction with textured vegetable protein (TVP) as a meat substitute. Softer tofus are sometimes used as a dairy-free or low-calorie filler. Silken tofu may be used to replace cheese in certain dishes, such as lasagna. Tofu has also been fused into other cuisines in the West, for instance in Indian-style curries.

Tofu and soy protein can be industrially processed to match the textures and flavors of cheese, pudding, eggs, bacon, and similar products. Tofu's texture can also be altered by freezing, puréeing, and cooking. In the Americas, Europe, Australia and New Zealand, tofu is frequently associated with vegetarianism and veganism, as it is a source of non-animal protein.

In India tofu is used as a low-fat replacement for paneer, providing the same texture with a similar taste.

Nutrition and health

Protein 
Tofu is relatively high in protein, about 10.7% for firm tofu and 5.3% for soft "silken" tofu, with about 5% and 2% fat respectively, as mass fraction. Most of tofu mass is water, typically between 76% and 91%.

Allergies 
Because it is made of soy, individuals with allergies to legumes should not consume tofu.

Traditional Chinese medicine claims 
Tofu is considered a cooling agent in traditional Chinese medicine. It is claimed to invigorate the spleen, replenish qi, moisten and cool off yang vacuity, and detoxify the body. However, there is no scientific evidence supporting such claims, nor their implied notions.

Chemistry 
Tofu is made from soy milk which is a turbid colloid liquid/solution. Tofu structure is related to soy milk components, particularly colloid components such as protein particles and oil globules. Protein particle content increases with the increase of the globulin ratio in the soybeans. Tofu varieties ensue from adding coagulants at various concentrations.

Proteins 
The two main components of the soybean important in tofu making are the 11S component, containing glycinin, and the 7S subunit, containing hemagglutinins, lipoxygenases, b-amylase, and β-conglycinin. The major soy protein components, in the two fractions that make up 65–85% of the proteins in soybeans, include glycinin and β-conglycinin. The soybean protein consists of many different subunits, which are sensitive to heat, pH, and ionic strength and become unevenly distributed among soluble and particulate fractions due to hydrophilic and hydrophobic interaction because of the amino acid composition.

See also 

 Tempeh
 Oncom
 Seitan
 Douhua
 Buddhist cuisine
 List of tofu dishes
 List of soy-based foods
 Vegetarian cuisine
 Veganism
 Los Angeles Tofu Festival

Notes

References

Sources 

 
 
 
 .
 
 
 .
 
 
 
 . (In Chinese.)
 .

Further reading 
 .
 Knopper, Melissa. (Jan 2002), The joy of soy, The Rotarian, Vol. 180, No. 1, p. 16, 
 .

External links 

 The Oxford companion to food Alan Davidson, Tom Jaine

 
Ancient dishes
Buddhist cuisine
Chinese cuisine
Japanese cuisine
Korean cuisine
Meat substitutes
Soy-based foods
Vegetarian dishes of China
Vietnamese cuisine